Aidhausen is a municipality in the district of Haßberge in Bavaria in Germany, it is a member of the Verwaltungsgemeinschaft Hofheim in Unterfranken.

Geography 
Aidhausen is located in the Main-Rhön region.
It is divided into the following districts: Aidhausen, Friesenhausen, Happertshausen, Kerbfeld and Nassach.

History 
Aidhausen was an office of the Prince-Bishopric of Würzburg. After the secularization it was given to Ferdinand III, Grand Duke of Tuscany for building up the Großherzogtum Würzburg. In the 1814 Treaty of Paris, it was given back to Bavaria.

Politics 
The municipal council in Aidhausen has 12 members, all of which were candidates for the combined list CSU/FW at the March 2020 local election.

Mayor 
The mayor is Dieter Möhring (Freie Wähler), in office since 2002.

References

External links 
  
  

Haßberge (district)